İhsan Yüce (23 January 1929 – 15 May 1991) was a Turkish actor and occasionally, scenarist and director.

Biography
İhsan Yüce studied at İzmir Atatürk High School and later at the İktisadi ve Ticari İlimler Akademisi. He began his acting career in İzmir and founded the Bizim Tiyatro and Drama Tiyatrosu.

His first prominent film role was in Altın Yumruk and he established himself with films such as  Senede Bir Gün, Bir Millet Uyanıyor ve Sürtüğün Kızı. He was awarded the Golden Orange for Best Actor for his performance in Derya Gülü.

All together, Yüce acted in a total of 117 films, wrote the screenplay for 55 films and directed 6 films.

References

External links

1930 births
1991 deaths
People from Elazığ
Turkish male film actors
Turkish film directors
Turkish male screenwriters
20th-century Turkish male actors
20th-century screenwriters